The Umgeni Steam Railway is a  gauge heritage railway at Inchanga, near Durban.

In 1982, a small Dubs locomotive was donated by the Illovo Sugar company to local enthusiasts; this was the start of the preservation group. A Class-3BR locomotive is used every month; it was built by North British Locomotive Company in February 1912. The coaches used were built between 1908 and 1953, with most being built in the 1930s.

Excursion Trains
On the last weekend of every month excursion trains are run from Inchanga to Bothas Hill because of flood damage between Bothas Hill and Kloof.

Museum
The Inchanga Railway Museum in the old Station Master's house next to the Inchanga Station, covers the history of South African Railways. It is open to the public on days when trains are operating.

Routes

The Umgeni Steam Railway currently operates trains on the last Sunday of all months of the year between Kloof and Inchanga, with special trains running from Pietermaritzburg to Inchanga and Nottingham Road. The route from Kloof to Inchanga follows the old main line from Durban to Pietermaritzburg and traverses some of the steepest railway gradients in South Africa (1:30 to 1:50).

Fleet

The fleet of steam locomotives includes a Class 3BR, Class 12R, Class 14R, two Class 19Ds, a Class GF Garratt and a Class GMAM Garratt, along with the locomotive that the company was started with - namely an 1892 vintage Class A "Dübs A".

Picture Gallery

(Click to enlarge)

External links
 http://umgenisteamrailway.com

References

Railway lines in South Africa
Heritage railways in South Africa
Railway museums in South Africa
3 ft 6 in gauge railways in South Africa
KwaZulu-Natal